Emir Zeba (born 10 June 1989) is a Bosnian-Herzegovinian retired football player who played as a midfielder.

Club career
Zeba joined second tier-Olimpik from Metalleghe-BSI in summer 2017.

References

External links
 
 

1989 births
Living people
Footballers from Sarajevo
Association football midfielders
Bosnia and Herzegovina footballers
FK Famos Hrasnica players
FK Slavija Sarajevo players
SK Dynamo České Budějovice players
1. SC Znojmo players
NK Metalleghe-BSI players
FK Olimpik players
Premier League of Bosnia and Herzegovina players
Czech First League players
First League of the Federation of Bosnia and Herzegovina players
Bosnia and Herzegovina expatriate footballers
Expatriate footballers in the Czech Republic
Bosnia and Herzegovina expatriate sportspeople in the Czech Republic